Bouchegouf is a district in Guelma Province, Algeria. It was named after its capital, the spa of Hammam N'Bails.

Municipalities
The district is further divided into 3 municipalities:
Hammam N'Bails
Dahouara 
Oued Cheham

References 

 
Districts of Guelma Province